
BTL may refer to:

General abbreviations
 Bachelor of Talmudic Law, an academic degree
 Bilateral tubal ligation, a medical procedure
 Biomass to liquid, synthesize of fuel from biomass
 Bridge-tied load, an output configuration for audio amplifiers
 Buy-to-let, a UK property investment strategy

Location codes
 Battle Creek (Amtrak station), Amtrak station code BTL, Battle Creek, Michigan
 W. K. Kellogg Airport, IATA identifier BTL, Battle Creek, Michigan

Companies
 BACnet Testing Laboratories
 Belize Telecommunications Limited
 Bell Telephone Laboratories
 Between the Lines Books, Canadian publisher
 BTL Brands, developer of McCoy's (crisp)

See also 
 Below the line (disambiguation)